The 2019 Pan American Racquetball Championships took place in Barranquilla, Colombia from April 12-20 at the Parque de Racquetas La Castellana, which was used for the 2018 Central American and Caribbean Games. Bolivia won both Men’s Singles and Doubles for the 1st time in tournament history, while Mexico won both Women’s Singles and Doubles for the 5th time.

Carlos Keller of Bolivia successfully defended the gold medal he won in 2018 by defeating the USA’s Charlie Pratt in the Men’s Singles final, and Keller’s brother Roland won gold in Men’s Doubles with Conrrado Moscoso, as they defeated Canadians Coby Iwaasa and Samuel Murray in the final. Roland Keller's gold was his 2nd in Men's Doubles at the Pan Am Championships, as he'd previously won gold with Ricardo Monroy in 2012.

Paola Longoria won Pan Am Championship gold in Women’s Singles for a record extending 8th time in Barranquilla, where she defeated Maria Jose Vargas in the final. Longoria and Samantha Salas won Women’s Doubles for a 6th time together. Their win over Colombians Cristina Amaya and Adriana Riveros in the final was the 6th consecutive title for Mexico. Mexico has won 9 of the last 10 Women’s Doubles titles at the Pan Am Championships, and either Longoria or Salas (or both) has been part of the winning team.

Tournament format
The competition had four events: Men’s and Women’s Singles and Doubles. Each event had a group stage followed by a medal round. The results of the group stage were used to seed players for the medal round. The group stage began April 13 and concluded April 15. The medal round began April 17.

Participating nations
A total of 15 countries have entered athletes: 42 men and 32 women.

Medal summary

Medal table

Medalists

Men’s singles

Preliminary round
Group A

Group B

Group C

Group D

Group E

Group F

Group G

Group H

Medal round

Men’s doubles

Group A

Group B

Group C

Group D

Medal Round

Women’s singles

Preliminary round
Group A

Group B

Group C

Group D

Group E

Group F

Group G

Medal round

Women’s doubles

Preliminary round
Group A

Group B

Group C

Group D

Medal round

References

External links
International Racquetball Federation

Racquetball
2019 in racquetball
2019 in Colombian sport
International sports competitions hosted by Colombia